Guy and Madeline on a Park Bench is a 2009 American romantic musical film directed, written, produced, shot, and co-edited by Damien Chazelle in his feature directorial debut. The film is an independent film shot in black-and-white in which the MGM musical tradition is reimagined in a gritty, vérité style. It stars Jason Palmer, Desiree Garcia and Sandha Khin. The film features a unique mixture of live jazz performances and choreographed tap dancing, as well as several more traditional musical numbers.

It had its world premiere at the Tribeca Film Festival on April 23, 2009. It was then released in a limited release on November 5, 2010, by Variance Films.

Plot

Set in modern-day Boston, Massachusetts, Guy and Madeline on a Park Bench tells the story of Guy and Madeline, a couple who has been dating for three months. He's an up-and-coming Boston jazz trumpeter, she an aimless introvert looking for work. The excitement of first love has faded, and Guy's wandering eye is caught by Elena, a more outgoing woman. When Elena and Guy meet on a crowded subway car, sparks fly—and that spells the end of Guy and Madeline's romance.

With Guy unexpectedly off in his new relationship, Madeline tries to rebuild her life. She changes apartments, searches for a new job, takes up an instrument, and goes on dates. Nothing clicks—until she travels to New York on a whim and meets a Frenchman named Paul, whom she feels an instant connection to. Meanwhile, Guy begins to wonder if he has made a mistake. Elena shows no interest in his music, and time and again the memories of Madeline come calling.

By the time Guy resolves to win her back, Madeline has seemingly moved on. He knocks on her door, but she's nowhere to be found, as she's preparing to move to New York City. He finally runs into her on a forgotten corner, where the two former lovers are faced with the question of whether they should let the past go, or rekindle their lost romance.

Production
Guy and Madeline on a Park Bench was shot on black and white 16mm film stock. Chazelle, who originally planned the project as his thesis film while an undergraduate at Harvard University, briefly left Harvard to focus on finishing the film.

The film features a cast of non-professional actors, though several are accomplished in other fields. Jason Palmer, who plays Guy, is a noted jazz trumpeter who was named one of the Top 25 Trumpeters of the Future by Downbeat Magazine in 2007, and was the first trumpet player to be hired by acclaimed guitarist Kurt Rosenwinkel to perform with his quintet.

Music
The film features all original music, composed by Justin Hurwitz with lyrics by Chazelle. The orchestral score was performed by the Bratislava Symphony Orchestra, while the jazz numbers contained in the film were performed by the cast, often live. The soundtrack for the film Guy and Madeline on a Park Bench: Original Motion Picture Soundtrack was released through  digital download on March 24, 2017, by Milan Records.

Release
The film had its world premiere at the Tribeca Film Festival on April 23, 2009. It went on to screen at the AFI Fest on October 30, 2009. It also screened at the Thessalonki International Film Festival, Mar del Plata International Film Festival, Torino Film Festival (where it won the Special Jury Prize), Mill Valley Film Festival, Starz Denver Film Festival, Viennale, Sarajevo Film Festival, Calgary International Film Festival (where it was a nominee for the Mavericks Award), International Film Festival Prague, and the Chicago International Movies and Music Festival (where it won the award for Best Fiction Feature). In March 2010, Variance Films acquired distribution rights to the film. The film was released in a limited release on November 5, 2010. The film was released on DVD by Cinema Guild on May 3, 2011.

Reception
Guy and Madeline on a Park Bench received positive reviews from film critics.  On Metacritic, the film holds a rating of 83 out of 100, based on 11 critics, indicating "universal acclaim".

The film premiered to a strong critical reception during its festival run. The Village Voice called the film "the kind of movie a young Cassavetes might have made were he working for MGM's Freed Unit". The Boston Globe called it "the most buzzed-about movie at the prestigious Tribeca Film Festival". Time Out New York called it "blissful, brilliant", and noted "one sequence involving a tap dancer, a jam session, and a house party is arguably the most joyous five minutes you're likely to experience in a theater". Several reviewers called the film a "mumblecore musical". Amy Taubin of Film Comment, John Anderson of Variety, David Fear of Time Out New York, and Elizabeth Weitzman of New York Daily News named it the best undistributed film of the year in 2009, and indieWIRE named it the #3 Best Undistributed Film of 2009 in its year-end critics' poll.

References

External links
 
 
 
 

2009 films
2000s musical drama films
American independent films
American musical drama films
2000s French-language films
Films directed by Damien Chazelle
Films with screenplays by Damien Chazelle
Films set in Massachusetts
Films shot in Massachusetts
Films shot in New York (state)
Variance Films films
Jazz films
Films scored by Justin Hurwitz
Mumblecore films
2009 directorial debut films
2009 drama films
2000s English-language films
2000s American films
2009 independent films
2009 multilingual films
American multilingual films